Jafar Gafar oglu Jabbarly, (20 March 1899, Khizi – 31 December 1934, Baku) was an Azerbaijani playwright, poet, director and screenwriter.

Life
After his father's death in 1902, Jabbarli's mother moved to Baku with her four children. In 1915, Jabbarli graduated from high school and studied electromechanics at Baku Polytechnicum for the next 5 years. In 1920 he was admitted to Azerbaijan State University to study applied medicine but due to his lack of interest soon switched to Oriental studies. In 1923, he started attending lectures at a local theatre to fulfill his interest in drama.

Jafar Jabbarli died at the age of 35 of heart failure and was buried at the Alley of Honor. The national film studio, Azerbaijanfilm, a street and a subway station in Baku are named after him.

On 22 May 1985 the museum "Jafar Jabbarli memorial house" was opened. It is located in the house on I. Gutgashinli street 44 (former G. Sultanov street), where Jafar Jabbarli used to live.

Literature, theatre and film
Jafar Jabbarli started writing poems in his early teenage years and was reported to have had his first poems published in the Azeri newspaper Hagigat-i Afkar in 1911. In the following years, he wrote more than 20 plays, as well as poems, essays, short stories, and articles. His works were very much influenced by the 1920s propaganda of Communist glory and celebrated appropriate themes such as equality, labour, education, cosmopolitanism, emancipation of women, cultural shifts, etc. Jabbarli's major accomplishment in introducing European plays to average Azerbaijanis was translating William Shakespeare's Hamlet into Azerbaijani. In

in 1925 and directing it at the Azerbaijan Drama Theatre a year later.

Jafar Jabbarli is considered the founder of screenwriting in Azerbaijan. Two of his plays, Sevil and Almaz, both written in 1928, were made into films in 1929 and 1936 respectively. Both focused on the theme of the role of women, their oppression, struggle, and ultimately, victory over dated patriarchal traditions.

See also
 House-Museum of Jafar Jabbarly (Baku)
 Statue of a Liberated Woman

References

External links
 Cafarcabbarli.com (archived)
 Short Stories and Dramas by Jafar Jabbarly Online at Azeri.org

 
1899 births
1934 deaths
People from Khizi District
Azerbaijani dramatists and playwrights
Azerbaijani male poets
Soviet screenwriters
Male screenwriters
Translators to Azerbaijani
Azerbaijani atheists
Burials at Alley of Honor
Baku State University alumni
People from Khizi
20th-century Azerbaijani poets
20th-century Azerbaijani dramatists and playwrights
20th-century male writers
20th-century translators
20th-century screenwriters
Writers from Baku
Honored Art Workers of the Azerbaijan SSR